Leyla Feray (born 8 May 1993) is a Turkish film and television actress.

Life and career 
Feray was born in Istanbul. She is a graduate of Koç University School of Media and Fine Arts. She made her acting debut in 2013 with a supporting role in the series Ben Onu Çok Sevdim. She continued her television career by appearing in Paşa Gönlüm as Türkan and in Üç Arkadaş as Gül Peri. She rose to prominence with her portrayal of Ayşe Sultan in the historical drama series Muhteşem Yüzyıl: Kösem. She made her cinematic debut in 2017 with her role in Kardeşim Benim 2 opposite Burak Özçivit and Murat Boz. In 2020, she had a brief role as Hüma Hatun in the Netflix docuseries Rise of Empires: Ottoman, and she starred in the TRT1 historical drama series Uyanış: Büyük Selçuklu as Gevher Hatun.

Filmography

References

External links 
 
 

1993 births
Living people
Actresses from Istanbul
Turkish television actresses
Turkish film actresses